Éva Sas (born 13 August 1970) is a French politician from Europe Ecology – The Greens. She was a Member of Parliament from 2012 to 2017, and has been again since 2022.

Early life 
Sas was born in Nice in 1970.

Political career 
She was elected in Essonne's 7th constituency at the 2012 French elections, unseating incumbent Republican MP Françoise Briand.

She lost her seat to Republican candidate Robin Reda at the 2017 French legislative election

She was an unsuccessful candidate in the 2018 Essonne's 1st constituency by-election.

She was the NUPES candidate in Paris's 8th constituency in the 2022 French legislative election. She was elected in the second round, defeating LREM candidate Laetitia Avia.

References 

1970 births
Living people
People from Nice
Europe Ecology – The Greens politicians
Deputies of the 14th National Assembly of the French Fifth Republic
Deputies of the 16th National Assembly of the French Fifth Republic
Women members of the National Assembly (France)
21st-century French women politicians
French environmentalists
French economists
Paris-Sorbonne University alumni
ESSEC Business School alumni
French people of Polish descent
Members of Parliament for Paris
Members of Parliament for Essonne